Die Bienen – Tödliche Bedrohung (English: Killer Bees) is a 2008 German television horror film directed by Michael Karen and stars Janin Reinhardt, Rolf Kanies, and Sonja Kirchberger.

Plot
When Karla brings her father Hans in Mallorca to a clinic because he was stung by a bee, it does not look good for him. The doctors want to find just a normal bee sting, but Karla does not consider it feasible. Together with the researcher Ben she gets down to find the true culprit—and finds oversized bees, which are also extremely aggressive. This new insect species is a major threat to thousands of people on the holiday island.

Cast

Production
The film was shot in only 23 days in Mallorca.

Release
The film aired on 16 October 2008 as a television film on Sat 1. In France it was released on 1 October 2009 as direct-to-DVD project as L'Île des abeilles tueuses. Killer Bees was given a US DVD release in June 2010 over Maverick Entertainment.

Soundtrack
The score was composed by the Bavarian film composer Siggi Mueller.

References

External links
 

2008 films
2008 television films
German television films
2008 horror films
German horror films
Horror television films
2000s German-language films
German-language television shows
2000s French-language films
Natural horror films
Films about bees
Films set in Spain
Television shows set in the Balearic Islands
Films set on islands
Television shows set on islands
Films shot in Mallorca
Films shot in Spain
2000s English-language films
2000s German films
Sat.1 original programming